The 2004 Speedway World Cup Final was the fourth and last race of the 2004 Speedway World Cup season. It took place on August 7, 2004 in the Poole Stadium in Poole, Great Britain.

Results

Heat details

References

See also 
 2004 Speedway World Cup
 motorcycle speedway

!